The Esaro is a river in the province of Crotone, Calabria, southern Italy. Its source is near Cutro. The river flows southeast near Crotone Airport before curving northeast and eventually flowing into the Ionian Sea just north of Crotone.

References

Drainage basins of the Ionian Sea
Rivers of the Province of Crotone
Rivers of Italy